Caisar Putra Aditya known as Caisar Keep Smile (born August 29, 1989) is an Indonesian comedian, dancer, and actor. He became popular since performing the  Caisar dance in Yuk Keep Smile. In March 2015, he stated he is leaving the world of entertainment to focus on his personal life and a career in business.

Personal life
Caisar Putra Aditya born on August 29, 1989, in Jakarta, Indonesia. He is the only child of Dadang Iskandar and Nani Suryati Ningsih. He married Indadari Mindrayanti on April 5, 2014, in Lampung. Caisar's wife is ex-girlfriend of the comedian Aming, and former spouse of the politician and actor, Lucky Hakim. They have one stepson and one child of their own.

Filmography

Film

Television

Awards and nominations

References

1989 births
Living people
Male actors from Jakarta
Indonesian male dancers
Sundanese people